Doda West Assembly constituency is one of the 90 constituencies in the Jammu and Kashmir Legislative Assembly of Jammu and Kashmir a north state of India. Doda West is also part of Udhampur Lok Sabha constituency. This constituency was created in 2022 after delimitation process in Jammu and Kashmir (union territory). In May 2022, the final list of new assembly constituencies was published in the gazette.

See also 

 Doda
 Doda constituency
 List of constituencies of the Jammu and Kashmir Legislative Assembly

References 

Assembly constituencies of Jammu and Kashmir
Doda district